Algeria (ALG) competed at the 1991 Mediterranean Games in Athens, Greece.

Medal summary

Medal table

References

International Mediterranean Games Committee

Nations at the 1991 Mediterranean Games
1991
Mediterranean Games